The 1622 North Guyuan earthquake struck Ningxia, China on 25 October with a magnitude of 7.0  and a maximum Mercalli intensity of X (Extreme). It was the only recorded big earthquake in western China for 148 years, between 1561 and 1709.

See also
List of earthquakes in China
List of historical earthquakes

References

Earthquakes in China
1622 earthquakes
1622 in China
History of Ningxia
Disasters in Ming dynasty